The Cathedral Basilica of the Immaculate Conception is a cathedral serving Roman Catholics in the U.S. city of Mobile, Alabama.  It is the seat of the Archbishop of the Roman Catholic Archdiocese of Mobile.  The cathedral is named for Mary, mother of Jesus, under her title, Our Lady of the Immaculate Conception. It is listed on the National Register of Historic Places as a contributing property to the Church Street East Historic District and Lower Dauphin Street Historic District and is listed on the Historic Roman Catholic Properties in Mobile Multiple Property Submission

History
Mobile’s Cathedral Parish was established on July 20, 1703, by Jean-Baptiste de la Croix de Chevrières de Saint-Vallier, Bishop of Quebec. Bishop de Saint-Vallier named Father Roulleaux de La Vente, first pastor of the parish church, which was located at the French settlement of Mobile at the citadel of Fort Louis de la Louisiane. The parish is the first established on the Gulf Coast.

When the Mobile settlement was relocated to its present site in 1711, a new parish church was built and was known as Notre Dame de la Mobile (Our Lady of Mobile). In 1781, during the Spanish occupation of Mobile, the parish took its current name, Immaculate Conception.

Mobile was elevated to a diocese in 1829, and Frenchman, Michael Portier, was named its first bishop. Bishop Portier’s first “cathedral” was a small wooden structure located in the Old Spanish Burying Ground, site of the present cathedral. Portier soon set out to construct a "real" cathedral.

Construction
The cathedral, designed in 1833, by Claude Beroujon, a former seminarian turned architect, is laid out in a Roman basilica design. Construction began in 1835, but the Panic of 1837, caused a shortage of funds and delayed progress. The cathedral was consecrated for public worship in 1850, by Bishop Portier, though Beroujon’s design was not yet fully realized. The portico and towers were to come later.

The classical portico, with eight massive columns of the Roman Doric order, was added in the 1870s, under the direction of Bishop John Quinlan. The two towers were completed in 1884, during the watch of Bishop Jeremiah O'Sullivan.

Location and dimensions
Located on South Claiborne Street in downtown, it is bounded by Dauphin Street on the north, Franklin Street on the west, and Conti Street on the south.  The front of the church faces east, toward the Mobile River, and overlooks Cathedral Square.

Stained glass windows

One of the cathedral’s finest attributes is its stained glass windows. The windows were made in Munich, Germany by Franz Mayer & Co., and installed beginning in 1890. The last window was installed in 1910, during the time of Bishop Edward Patrick Allen.

Each window depicts an event involving Mary in the life of her son, Jesus. The subjects of the south wall windows are Our Lady of the Immaculate Conception, the Presentation of Mary at the Temple, the Annunciation, the Visitation, the Nativity of Jesus, and the Holy Family. The themes of the north wall are the Finding of the Child Jesus at the Temple, the Marriage Feast of Cana, the Crucifixion of Jesus, Pentecost, the  Assumption of Mary into Heaven, and the Coronation of Mary, Queen of Heaven.

Two large windows flank the portico, one under each of the two towers. The Baptism of Jesus in the River Jordan, by John the Baptist is the subject of the window in the Reconciliation Room, under the north tower. The window under the south tower, in the stairway to the choir loft, appropriately depicts St. Cecilia, patron saint of musicians.

Smaller windows are found in each of the eight doors in the foyer, behind the cathedral’s main doors, at the church’s front entrance. These depict, from left to right, St. Augustine of Hippo, Our Lady of Mount Carmel, the Presentation of Mary at the Temple, St. Louis IX, King of France, St. Patrick, Our Lady of the Immaculate Conception, St. Agnes of Rome, Virgin & Martyr , and the Most Sacred Heart of Jesus.  Above the four middle doors is the Holy Spirit window.

Fire and other damage
Over the course of time, the cathedral experienced its share of disasters, including an explosion, a fire, an airplane hit, and hurricanes.

On May 25, 1865, a Union Army ammunition depot exploded, killing some 300 persons, and burning much of Mobile. The windows and sashes on the north side of the cathedral were blown in by the explosion. There were no services being held in the cathedral at the time.

During World War II, a pilot-in-training, flying low, clipped one of the towers, resulting in damage.

Disaster struck on March 19, 1954, when a homeless man, seeking shelter in the church, caused a fire that destroyed the sanctuary. The church still stood, but the interior suffered damage from fire, smoke, and water from the firefighters’ attempt to control the blaze.

Repair, renovation and restoration

After the 1954 fire, Bishop Thomas Joseph Toolen had the damaged stained glass windows sent to the Franz Meyer workshops in Munich for repair. Here the craftsmen used the original drawings as a guide in their restoration efforts.  He replaced the fire-damaged cathedra and pulpit with new ones made of mahogany. A replacement organ, built by the Wicks Organ Company, was installed and is in use today. At this time, Toolen added a massive bronze baldachin above the altar, supported by four marble columns.

In the 1970s, Bishop John L. May made modifications to the sanctuary in compliance with the 1970 General Instruction of the Roman Missal. The altar was moved forward and the altar rails were removed. The cathedra was moved to its present location on the south end of the sanctuary facing the congregation. At this time, Bishop May also added a bronze representation of the Risen Christ above the baldachin and a large crucifix over the tabernacle.

Archbishop Oscar Hugh Lipscomb led the most recent restoration effort in the 2000s. Under his direction, the cast-iron fence was restored and repaired, and the cathedral exterior was cleaned and repaired. An interior overhaul, executed by Conrad Schmitt Studios, included a coffer ceiling above the main aisle. The coffers are decorated with alternating gold-leafed fleur-de-lis and shamrock, symbolically representing the Trinity, as well as the contributions of the French and Irish religious to the life of the Archdiocese. New lighting and a new color scheme brightens the interior. White marble flooring was installed in the aisles and the heart pine floors under the pews were refinished. Embedded in the marble floor of the main aisle are the coats-of-arms of the Mobile bishops and archbishops. A mural of the Tree of Jesse was installed above the pipe organ.

Basilica designation 

In 1962,  Pope John XXIII elevated the cathedral to a minor basilica, a title bestowed, only by the pope, on churches of historical and spiritual importance. A basilica is entitled to have its own coat-of-arms. Other basilica insignia include Pope John XXIII's personal coat-of-arms installed above the cathedral entrance, the yellow and red umbracullum (umbrella) and tintinnabulum (bell) in the sanctuary.

Gallery
A gallery of photographs taken October 23, 1936, for the Historic American Buildings Survey. Note the interior as it looked before the fire of 1954.

See also

List of Catholic cathedrals in the United States
List of cathedrals in the United States

References

External links
Official Cathedral Site
Roman Catholic Archdiocese of Mobile Official Site 

1703 establishments in the French colonial empire
Roman Catholic churches completed in 1850
Immaculate Conception Mobile
Immaculate Conception Mobile
Roman Catholic churches in Mobile, Alabama
Greek Revival church buildings in Alabama
Immaculate Conception in Mobile, Cathedral of the
Immaculate Conception in Mobile, Cathedral of the
African American Heritage Trail of Mobile
Historic American Buildings Survey in Alabama
19th-century Roman Catholic church buildings in the United States